Carbon monoxide (chemical formula CO) is a poisonous, flammable gas that is colorless, odorless, tasteless, and slightly less dense than air. Carbon monoxide consists of one carbon atom and one oxygen atom connected by a triple bond. It is the simplest carbon oxide. In coordination complexes the carbon monoxide ligand is called carbonyl.  It is a key ingredient in many processes in industrial chemistry.

The most common source of carbon monoxide is the partial combustion of carbon-containing compounds, when insufficient oxygen or heat is present to produce carbon dioxide. There are also numerous environmental and biological sources that generate and emit a significant amount of carbon monoxide. It is important in the production of many compounds, including drugs, fragrances, and fuels. Upon emission into the atmosphere, carbon monoxide affects several processes that contribute to climate change.

Carbon monoxide has important biological roles across phylogenetic kingdoms. It is produced by many organisms, including humans. In mammalian physiology, carbon monoxide is a classical example of hormesis where low concentrations serve as an endogenous neurotransmitter (gasotransmitter) and high concentrations are toxic resulting in carbon monoxide poisoning. It is isoelectronic with cyanide anion CN−.

History

Prehistory 
Humans have maintained a complex relationship with carbon monoxide since first learning to control fire circa 800,000 BC. Early humans probably discovered the toxicity of carbon monoxide poisoning upon introducing fire into their dwellings. The early development of metallurgy and smelting technologies emerging circa 6,000 BC through the Bronze Age likewise plagued humankind from carbon monoxide exposure. Apart from the toxicity of carbon monoxide, indigenous Native Americans may have experienced the neuroactive properties of carbon monoxide through shamanistic fireside rituals.

Ancient history 
Early civilizations developed mythological tales to explain the origin of fire, such as Prometheus from Greek mythology who shared fire with humans. Aristotle (384–322 BC) first recorded that burning coals produced toxic fumes. Greek physician Galen (129–199 AD) speculated that there was a change in the composition of the air that caused harm when inhaled, and many others of the era developed a basis of knowledge about carbon monoxide in the context of coal fume toxicity. Cleopatra may have died from carbon monoxide poisoning.

Pre-Industrial Revolution
Georg Ernst Stahl mentioned carbonarii halitus in 1697 in reference to toxic vapors thought to be carbon monoxide. Friedrich Hoffmann conducted the first modern scientific investigation into carbon monoxide poisoning from coal in 1716. Herman Boerhaave conducted the first scientific experiments on the effect of carbon monoxide (coal fumes) on animals in the 1730s.

Joseph Priestley is considered to have first synthesized carbon monoxide in 1772. Carl Wilhelm Scheele similarly isolated carbon monoxide from charcoal in 1773 and thought it could be the carbonic entity making fumes toxic. Torbern Bergman isolated carbon monoxide from oxalic acid in 1775. Later in 1776, the French chemist  produced CO by heating zinc oxide with coke, but mistakenly concluded that the gaseous product was hydrogen, as it burned with a blue flame. In the presence of oxygen, including atmospheric concentrations, carbon monoxide burns with a blue flame, producing carbon dioxide. Antoine Lavoisier conducted similar inconclusive experiments to Lassone in 1777. The gas was identified as a compound containing carbon and oxygen by William Cruickshank in 1800.

Thomas Beddoes and James Watt recognized carbon monoxide (as hydrocarbonate) to brighten venous blood in 1793. Watt suggested coal fumes could act as an antidote to the oxygen in blood, and Beddoes and Watt likewise suggested hydrocarbonate has a greater affinity for animal fiber than oxygen in 1796. In 1854, Adrien Chenot similarly suggested carbon monoxide to remove the oxygen from blood and then be oxidized by the body to carbon dioxide. The mechanism for carbon monoxide poisoning is widely credited to Claude Bernard whose memoirs beginning in 1846 and published in 1857 phrased, "prevents arterials blood from becoming venous". Felix Hoppe-Seyler independently published similar conclusions in the following year.

Advent of industrial chemistry
Carbon monoxide gained recognition as an invaluable reagent in the 1900s.  Three industrial processes illustrate its evolution in industry.  In the Fischer–Tropsch process, coal and related carbon-rich feedstocks are converted into liquid fuels via the intermediacy of CO.  Originally developed as part of the German war effort to compensate for their lack of domestic petroleum, this technology continues today.  Also in Germany, a mixture of CO and hydrogen was found to combine with olefins to give aldehydes.  This process, called hydroformylation, is used to produce many large scale chemicals such as surfactants as well as specialty compounds that are popular fragrances and drugs.  For example, CO is used in the production of vitamin A. In a third major process, attributed to researchers at Monsanto, CO combines with methanol to give acetic acid. Most acetic acid is produced by the Cativa process.  Hydroformylation and the acetic acid syntheses are two of myriad carbonylation processes.

Physical and chemical properties
Carbon monoxide is the simplest oxocarbon and is isoelectronic with other triply-bonded diatomic species possessing 10 valence electrons, including the cyanide anion, the nitrosonium cation, boron monofluoride and molecular nitrogen. It has a molar mass of 28.0, which, according to the ideal gas law, makes it slightly less dense than air, whose average molar mass is 28.8.

The carbon and oxygen are connected by a triple bond that consists of a net two pi bonds and one sigma bond. The bond length between the carbon atom and the oxygen atom is 112.8 pm. This bond length is consistent with a triple bond, as in molecular nitrogen (N2), which has a similar bond length (109.76 pm) and nearly the same molecular mass. Carbon–oxygen double bonds are significantly longer, 120.8 pm in formaldehyde, for example. The boiling point (82 K) and melting point (68 K) are very similar to those of N2 (77 K and 63 K, respectively). The bond-dissociation energy of 1072 kJ/mol is stronger than that of N2 (942 kJ/mol) and represents the strongest chemical bond known.

The ground electronic state of carbon monoxide is a singlet state since there are no unpaired electrons.

Table of thermal and physical properties of carbon monoxide (CO) at atmospheric pressure:

Bonding and dipole moment
Carbon and oxygen together have a total of 10 electrons in the valence shell. Following the octet rule for both carbon and oxygen, the two atoms form a triple bond, with six shared electrons in three bonding molecular orbitals, rather than the usual double bond found in organic carbonyl compounds. Since four of the shared electrons come from the oxygen atom and only two from carbon, one bonding orbital is occupied by two electrons from oxygen, forming a dative or dipolar bond. This causes a C←O polarization of the molecule, with a small negative charge on carbon and a small positive charge on oxygen. The other two bonding orbitals are each occupied by one electron from carbon and one from oxygen, forming (polar) covalent bonds with a reverse C→O polarization since oxygen is more electronegative than carbon. In the free carbon monoxide molecule, a net negative charge δ– remains at the carbon end and the molecule has a small dipole moment of 0.122 D.

The molecule is therefore asymmetric: oxygen has more electron density than carbon and is also slightly positively charged compared to carbon being negative. By contrast, the isoelectronic dinitrogen molecule has no dipole moment.

Carbon monoxide has a computed fractional bond order of 2.6, indicating that the "third" bond is important but constitutes somewhat less than a full bond.  Thus, in valence bond terms, –C≡O+ is the most important structure, while :C=O is non-octet, but has a neutral formal charge on each atom and represents the second most important resonance contributor.  Because of the lone pair and divalence of carbon in this resonance structure, carbon monoxide is often considered to be an extraordinarily stabilized carbene.  Isocyanides are compounds in which the O is replaced by an NR (R = alkyl or aryl) group and have a similar bonding scheme.

If carbon monoxide acts as a ligand, the polarity of the dipole may reverse with a net negative charge on the oxygen end, depending on the structure of the coordination complex.
See also the section "Coordination chemistry" below.

Bond polarity and oxidation state
Theoretical and experimental studies show that, despite the greater electronegativity of oxygen, the dipole moment points from the more-negative carbon end to the more-positive oxygen end. The three bonds are in fact polar covalent bonds that are strongly polarized. The calculated polarization toward the oxygen atom is 71% for the σ-bond and 77% for both π-bonds.

The oxidation state of carbon in carbon monoxide is +2 in each of these structures. It is calculated by counting all the bonding electrons as belonging to the more electronegative oxygen. Only the two non-bonding electrons on carbon are assigned to carbon. In this count, carbon then has only two valence electrons in the molecule compared to four in the free atom.

Occurrence

Carbon monoxide occurs in various natural and artificial environments. Photochemical degradation of plant matter for example generates an estimated 60 billion kilograms/year. Typical concentrations in parts per million are as follows:

Atmospheric presence

Carbon monoxide (CO) is present in small amounts (about 80 ppb) in the Earth's atmosphere. Most of the rest comes from chemical reactions with organic compounds emitted by human activities and natural origins due to photochemical reactions in the troposphere that generate about 5 × 1012 kilograms per year. Other natural sources of CO include volcanoes, forest and bushfires, and other miscellaneous forms of combustion such as fossil fuels. Small amounts are also emitted from the ocean, and from geological activity because carbon monoxide occurs dissolved in molten volcanic rock at high pressures in the Earth's mantle. Because natural sources of carbon monoxide vary from year to year, it is difficult to accurately measure natural emissions of the gas.

Carbon monoxide has an indirect effect on radiative forcing by elevating concentrations of direct greenhouse gases, including methane and tropospheric ozone. CO can react chemically with other atmospheric constituents (primarily the hydroxyl radical, •OH) that would otherwise destroy methane. Through natural processes in the atmosphere, it is oxidized to carbon dioxide and ozone. Carbon monoxide is short-lived in the atmosphere (with an average lifetime of about one to two months), and spatially variable in concentration.

Due to its long lifetime in the mid-troposphere, carbon monoxide is also used as a tracer for pollutant plumes.

Pollution

Urban pollution
Carbon monoxide is a temporary atmospheric pollutant in some urban areas, chiefly from the exhaust of internal combustion engines (including vehicles, portable and back-up generators, lawnmowers, power washers, etc.), but also from incomplete combustion of various other fuels (including wood, coal, charcoal, oil, paraffin, propane, natural gas, and trash).

Large CO pollution events can be observed from space over cities.

Role in ground level ozone formation

Carbon monoxide is, along with aldehydes, part of the series of cycles of chemical reactions that form photochemical smog. It reacts with hydroxyl radical (•OH) to produce a radical intermediate •HOCO, which transfers rapidly its radical hydrogen to O2 to form peroxy radical (HO2•) and carbon dioxide. Peroxy radical subsequently reacts with nitrogen oxide (NO) to form nitrogen dioxide (NO2) and hydroxyl radical. NO2 gives O(3P) via photolysis, thereby forming O3 following reaction with O2.
Since hydroxyl radical is formed during the formation of NO2, the balance of the sequence of chemical reactions starting with carbon monoxide and leading to the formation of ozone is:
CO + 2O2 + hν →  + O3
(where hν refers to the photon of light absorbed by the NO2 molecule in the sequence)

Although the creation of NO2 is the critical step leading to low level ozone formation, it also increases this ozone in another, somewhat mutually exclusive way, by reducing the quantity of NO that is available to react with ozone.

Indoor pollution
In closed environments, the concentration of carbon monoxide can rise to lethal levels. On average, 170 people in the United States die every year from carbon monoxide produced by non-automotive consumer products.
These products include malfunctioning fuel-burning appliances such as furnaces, ranges, water heaters, and gas and kerosene room heaters; engine-powered equipment such as portable generators (and cars left running in attached garages); fireplaces; and charcoal that is burned in homes and other enclosed areas. Many deaths have occurred during power outages due to severe weather such as Hurricane Katrina and the 2021 Texas power crisis.

Mining 
Miners refer to carbon monoxide as "whitedamp" or the "silent killer". It can be found in confined areas of poor ventilation in both surface mines and underground mines. The most common sources of carbon monoxide in mining operations are the internal combustion engine and explosives; however, in coal mines, carbon monoxide can also be found due to the low-temperature oxidation of coal. The idiom "Canary in the coal mine" pertained to an early warning of a carbon monoxide presence.

Astronomy 
Beyond Earth, carbon monoxide is the second-most common diatomic molecule in the interstellar medium, after molecular hydrogen.  Because of its asymmetry, this polar molecule produces far brighter spectral lines than the hydrogen molecule, making CO much easier to detect.  Interstellar CO was first detected with radio telescopes in 1970. It is now the most commonly used tracer of molecular gas in general in the interstellar medium of galaxies, as molecular hydrogen can only be detected using ultraviolet light, which requires space telescopes. Carbon monoxide observations provide much of the information about the molecular clouds in which most stars form.

Beta Pictoris, the second brightest star in the constellation Pictor, shows an excess of infrared emission compared to normal stars of its type, which is caused by large quantities of dust and gas (including carbon monoxide) near the star.

In the atmosphere of Venus carbon monoxide occurs as a result of the photodissociation of carbon dioxide by electromagnetic radiation of wavelengths shorter than 169 nm. It has also been identified spectroscopically on the surface of Neptune's moon Triton.

Solid carbon monoxide is a component of comets. The volatile or "ice" component of Halley's Comet is about 15% CO. There is very little CO in the atmosphere of Pluto, which seems to have been formed from comets. This may be because there is (or was) liquid water inside Pluto.

Carbon monoxide can react with water to form carbon dioxide and hydrogen:

CO + H2O →  + 

This is called the water-gas shift reaction when occurring in the gas phase, but it can also take place (very slowly) in an aqueous solution.
If the hydrogen partial pressure is high enough (for instance in an underground sea), formic acid will be formed:

CO + H2O → HCOOH

These reactions can take place in a few million years even at temperatures such as found on Pluto.

Chemistry 
Carbon monoxide has a wide range of functions across all disciplines of chemistry. The four premier categories of reactivity involve metal-carbonyl catalysis, radical chemistry, cation and anion chemistries.

Coordination chemistry

Most metals form coordination complexes containing covalently attached carbon monoxide. Only metals in lower oxidation states will complex with carbon monoxide ligands. This is because there must be sufficient electron density to facilitate back-donation from the metal dxz-orbital, to the π* molecular orbital from CO. The lone pair on the carbon atom in CO also donates electron density to the dx²−y² on the metal to form a sigma bond. This electron donation is also exhibited with the cis effect, or the labilization of CO ligands in the cis position. Nickel carbonyl, for example, forms by the direct combination of carbon monoxide and nickel metal:
 Ni + 4 CO → Ni(CO)4 (1 bar, 55 °C)
For this reason, nickel in any tubing or part must not come into prolonged contact with carbon monoxide. Nickel carbonyl decomposes readily back to Ni and CO upon contact with hot surfaces, and this method is used for the industrial purification of nickel in the Mond process.

In nickel carbonyl and other carbonyls, the electron pair on the carbon interacts with the metal; the carbon monoxide donates the electron pair to the metal. In these situations, carbon monoxide is called the carbonyl ligand. One of the most important metal carbonyls is iron pentacarbonyl, Fe(CO)5:

Many metal–CO complexes are prepared by decarbonylation of organic solvents, not from CO. For instance, iridium trichloride and triphenylphosphine react in boiling 2-methoxyethanol or DMF to afford IrCl(CO)(PPh3)2.

Metal carbonyls in coordination chemistry are usually studied using infrared spectroscopy.

Organic and main group chemistry

In the presence of strong acids and water, carbon monoxide reacts with alkenes to form carboxylic acids in a process known as the Koch–Haaf reaction. In the Gattermann–Koch reaction, arenes are converted to benzaldehyde derivatives in the presence of AlCl3 and HCl. Organolithium compounds (e.g. butyl lithium) react with carbon monoxide, but these reactions have little scientific use.

Although CO reacts with carbocations and carbanions, it is relatively nonreactive toward organic compounds without the intervention of metal catalysts.

With main group reagents, CO undergoes several noteworthy reactions. Chlorination of CO is the industrial route to the important compound phosgene. With borane CO forms the adduct H3BCO, which is isoelectronic with the acetylium cation [H3CCO]+. CO reacts with sodium to give products resulting from C−C coupling such as sodium acetylenediolate 2·. It reacts with molten potassium to give a mixture of an organometallic compound, potassium acetylenediolate 2·, potassium benzenehexolate 6, and potassium rhodizonate 2·.

The compounds cyclohexanehexone or triquinoyl (C6O6) and cyclopentanepentone or leuconic acid (C5O5), which so far have been obtained only in trace amounts, can be regarded as polymers of carbon monoxide. At pressures exceeding 5 GPa, carbon monoxide converts to polycarbonyl, a solid polymer that is metastable at atmospheric pressure but is explosive.

Laboratory preparation 
Carbon monoxide is conveniently produced in the laboratory by the dehydration of formic acid or oxalic acid, for example with concentrated sulfuric acid. Another method is heating an intimate mixture of powdered zinc metal and calcium carbonate, which releases CO and leaves behind zinc oxide and calcium oxide:

Zn + CaCO3 → ZnO + CaO + CO

Silver nitrate and iodoform also afford carbon monoxide:

CHI3 + 3AgNO3 + H2O → 3HNO3 + CO + 3AgI

Finally, metal oxalate salts release CO upon heating, leaving a carbonate as byproduct:

  →  +

Production 
Thermal combustion is the most common source for carbon monoxide. Carbon monoxide is produced from the partial oxidation of carbon-containing compounds; it forms when there is not enough oxygen to produce carbon dioxide, such as when operating a stove or an internal combustion engine in an enclosed space. For example, during World War II, a gas mixture including carbon monoxide was used to keep motor vehicles running in parts of the world where gasoline and diesel fuel were scarce. External (with a few exceptions) charcoals or wood gas generators were fitted, and the mixture of atmospheric nitrogen, hydrogen, carbon monoxide, and small amounts of other gases produced by gasification was piped to a gas mixer. The gas mixture produced by this process is known as wood gas.

A large quantity of CO byproduct is formed during the oxidative processes for the production of chemicals. For this reason, the process off-gases have to be purified. 

Many methods have been developed for carbon monoxide production.

Industrial production
A major industrial source of CO is producer gas, a mixture containing mostly carbon monoxide and nitrogen, formed by combustion of carbon in air at high temperature when there is an excess of carbon. In an oven, air is passed through a bed of coke. The initially produced  equilibrates with the remaining hot carbon to give CO. Above 800 °C, CO is the predominant product:

 (g) + C (s) → 2 CO (g) (ΔHr = 170 kJ/mol)

Another source is "water gas", a mixture of hydrogen and carbon monoxide produced via the endothermic reaction of steam and carbon:

H2O (g) + C (s) → H2 (g) + CO (g) (ΔHr = 131 kJ/mol)

Other similar "synthesis gases" can be obtained from natural gas and other fuels.

Carbon monoxide can also be produced by high-temperature electrolysis of carbon dioxide with solid oxide electrolyzer cells. One method developed at DTU Energy uses a cerium oxide catalyst and does not have any issues of fouling of the catalyst.

2  → 2 CO + O2

Carbon monoxide is also a byproduct of the reduction of metal oxide ores with carbon, shown in a simplified form as follows:

MO + C → M + CO

Carbon monoxide is also produced by the direct oxidation of carbon in a limited supply of oxygen or air.

2 C + O2 → 2 CO

Since CO is a gas, the reduction process can be driven by heating, exploiting the positive (favorable) entropy of reaction.

Use

Chemical industry
Carbon monoxide is an industrial gas that has many applications in bulk chemicals manufacturing. Large quantities of aldehydes are produced by the hydroformylation reaction of alkenes, carbon monoxide, and H2. Hydroformylation is coupled to the Shell higher olefin process to give precursors to detergents.

Phosgene, useful for preparing isocyanates, polycarbonates, and polyurethanes, is produced by passing purified carbon monoxide and chlorine gas through a bed of porous activated carbon, which serves as a catalyst.  World production of this compound was estimated to be 2.74 million tonnes in 1989.
CO + Cl2 → COCl2
Methanol is produced by the hydrogenation of carbon monoxide. In a related reaction, the hydrogenation of carbon monoxide is coupled to C−C bond formation, as in the Fischer–Tropsch process where carbon monoxide is hydrogenated to liquid hydrocarbon fuels. This technology allows coal or biomass to be converted to diesel.

In the Cativa process, carbon monoxide and methanol react in the presence of a homogeneous Iridium catalyst and hydroiodic acid to give acetic acid. This process is responsible for most of the industrial production of acetic acid.

Metallurgy
 

Carbon monoxide is a strong reductive agent and has been used in pyrometallurgy to reduce metals from ores since ancient times. Carbon monoxide strips oxygen off metal oxides, reducing them to pure metal in high temperatures, forming carbon dioxide in the process. Carbon monoxide is not usually supplied as is, in the gaseous phase, in the reactor, but rather it is formed in high temperature in presence of oxygen-carrying ore, or a carboniferous agent such as coke, and high temperature. The blast furnace process is a typical example of a process of reduction of metal from ore with carbon monoxide.

Likewise, blast furnace gas collected at the top of blast furnace, still contains some 10% to 30% of carbon monoxide, and is used as fuel on Cowper stoves and on Siemens-Martin furnaces on open hearth steelmaking.

Lasers
Carbon monoxide has also been used as a lasing medium in high-powered infrared lasers.

Proposed use as fuel on Mars
Carbon monoxide has been proposed for use as a fuel on Mars. Carbon monoxide/oxygen engines have been suggested for early surface transportation use as both carbon monoxide and oxygen can be straightforwardly produced from the carbon dioxide atmosphere of Mars by zirconia electrolysis, without using any Martian water resources to obtain hydrogen, which would be needed to make methane or any hydrogen-based fuel.

Biological and physiological properties

Physiology

Carbon monoxide is a bioactive molecule which acts as a gaseous signaling molecule. It is naturally produced by many enzymatic and non-enzymatic pathways, the best understood of which is the catabolic action of heme oxygenase on the heme derived from hemoproteins such as hemoglobin. Following the first report that carbon monoxide is a normal neurotransmitter in 1993, carbon monoxide has received significant clinical attention as a biological regulator.

Because of carbon monoxide's role in the body, abnormalities in its metabolism have been linked to a variety of diseases, including neurodegenerations, hypertension, heart failure, and pathological inflammation. In many tissues, carbon monoxide acts as anti-inflammatory, vasodilatory, and encouragers of neovascular growth. In animal model studies, carbon monoxide reduced the severity of experimentally induced bacterial sepsis, pancreatitis, hepatic ischemia/reperfusion injury, colitis, osteoarthritis, lung injury, lung transplantation rejection, and neuropathic pain while promoting skin wound healing. Therefore, there is significant interest in the therapeutic potential of carbon monoxide becoming pharmaceutical agent and clinical standard of care.

Medicine

Studies involving carbon monoxide have been conducted in many laboratories throughout the world for its anti-inflammatory and cytoprotective properties. These properties have the potential to be used to prevent the development of a series of pathological conditions including ischemia reperfusion injury, transplant rejection, atherosclerosis, severe sepsis, severe malaria, or autoimmunity. Many pharmaceutical drug delivery initiatives have developed methods to safely administer carbon monoxide, and subsequent controlled clinical trials have evaluated the therapeutic effect of carbon monoxide.

Microbiology
Microbiota may also utilize carbon monoxide as a gasotransmitter. Carbon monoxide sensing is a signaling pathway facilitated by proteins such as CooA. The scope of the biological roles for carbon monoxide sensing is still unknown.

The human microbiome produces, consumes, and responds to carbon monoxide. For example, in certain bacteria, carbon monoxide is produced via the reduction of carbon dioxide by the enzyme carbon monoxide dehydrogenase with favorable bioenergetics to power downstream cellular operations. In another example, carbon monoxide is a nutrient for methanogenic archaea which reduce it to methane using hydrogen.

Carbon monoxide has certain antimicrobial properties which have been studied to treat against infectious diseases.

Food science
Carbon monoxide is used in modified atmosphere packaging systems in the US, mainly with fresh meat products such as beef, pork, and fish to keep them looking fresh. The benefit is two-fold, carbon monoxide protects against microbial spoilage and it enhances the meat color for consumer appeal. The carbon monoxide combines with myoglobin to form carboxymyoglobin, a bright-cherry-red pigment. Carboxymyoglobin is more stable than the oxygenated form of myoglobin, oxymyoglobin, which can become oxidized to the brown pigment metmyoglobin. This stable red color can persist much longer than in normally packaged meat. Typical levels of carbon monoxide used in the facilities that use this process are between 0.4% and 0.5%.

The technology was first given "generally recognized as safe" (GRAS) status by the U.S. Food and Drug Administration (FDA) in 2002 for use as a secondary packaging system, and does not require labeling. In 2004, the FDA approved CO as primary packaging method, declaring that CO does not mask spoilage odor. The process is currently unauthorized in many other countries, including Japan, Singapore, and the European Union.

Toxicity

Carbon monoxide poisoning is the most common type of fatal air poisoning in many countries. The Centers for Disease Control and Prevention estimates that several thousand people go to hospital emergency rooms every year to be treated for carbon monoxide poisoning. According to the Florida Department of Health, "every year more than 500 Americans die from accidental exposure to carbon monoxide and thousands more across the U.S. require emergency medical care for non-fatal carbon monoxide poisoning." The American Association of Poison Control Centers (AAPCC) reported 15,769 cases of carbon monoxide poisoning resulting in 39 deaths in 2007. In 2005, the CPSC reported 94 generator-related carbon monoxide poisoning deaths.

Carbon monoxide is colorless, odorless, and tasteless. As such, it is relatively undetectable. It readily combines with hemoglobin to produce carboxyhemoglobin which potentially affects gas exchange; therefore exposure can be highly toxic. Concentrations as low as 667 ppm may cause up to 50% of the body's hemoglobin to convert to carboxyhemoglobin. A level of 50% carboxyhemoglobin may result in seizure, coma, and fatality. In the United States, the OSHA limits long-term workplace exposure levels above 50 ppm.

In addition to affecting oxygen delivery, carbon monoxide also binds to other hemoproteins such as myoglobin and mitochondrial cytochrome oxidase, metallic and non-metallic cellular targets to affect many cell operations.

Weaponization 
In ancient history, Hannibal executed Roman prisoners with coal fumes during the Second Punic War.

Carbon monoxide had been used for genocide during the Holocaust at some extermination camps, the most notable by gas vans in Chełmno, and in the Action T4 "euthanasia" program.

See also

Hydrocarbonate (gas)

Smoker's paradox
 – hyperbaric treatment for CO poisoning
 research articles on CO poisoning

References

External links

 Global map of carbon monoxide distribution
 Explanation of the structure
 International Chemical Safety Card 0023
 CDC NIOSH Pocket Guide to Chemical Hazards: Carbon monoxide—National Institute for Occupational Safety and Health (NIOSH), US Centers for Disease Control and Prevention (CDC)
 Carbon Monoxide—NIOSH Workplace Safety and Health Topic—CDC
 Carbon Monoxide Poisoning—Frequently Asked Questions—CDC
 External MSDS data sheet
 Carbon Monoxide Detector Placement
 Microscale Gas Chemistry Experiments with Carbon Monoxide
 

Airborne pollutants
Articles containing video clips
 
Gaseous signaling molecules
Industrial gases
Oxocarbons
Smog
Toxicology
Diatomic molecules